Gianni Scipione Rossi (born November 9, 1953 in Viterbo, Italy) is an Italian journalist and essayist.

References 

Italian journalists
Italian male journalists
People from Viterbo
1953 births
Living people